Kundara is a legislative assembly constituency in Kollam district of Kerala, India. It is one among the 11 assembly constituencies in Kollam district. As of the 2021 assembly elections, the current MLA is P. C. Vishnunath of INC.

History
The constituency was previously named as Perinad Assembly Constituency. In 1957, it was dissolved and formed Thrikkadavoor constituency. During the election of 1960, Thrikkadavur was a two-member constituency. Later in 1967, Kundara constituency was formed by dissolving Thrikkadavur. After the general assembly election held in 1967, P. K. Sukumaran of CPI(M) became the first elected member from Kundara assembly constituency.

Structure
As per the recent changes on assembly constituency delimitations, Kundara assembly constituency consists of 5 panchayaths from Kollam Taluk including Elampalloor, Kottamkara, Nedumpana, Perayam and Perinad.

Major institutions in the constituency
 Panchayaths: 5 (Elampalloor, Kottamkara, Nedumpana, Perayam, Perinad, Kundara)
 Railway stations: 3 (Kundara, Kundara East, Perinad)
 Medical college hospital: 1 (Azeezia Medical College, Meeyannoor)
 Government hospitals: 1 (Govt. Taluk Hospital, Kundara)

Members of Legislative Assembly 
The following list contains all members of Kerala legislative assembly who have represented the constituency:

Key

Election results 
Percentage change (±%) denotes the change in the number of votes from the immediate previous election.

Niyamasabha Election 2016 
There were 2,00,163 registered voters in the constituency for the 2016 Kerala Niyamasabha Election.

Niyamasabha Election 2011 
There were 1,78,990 registered voters in the constituency for the 2011 election.

References

Assembly constituencies of Kerala
Assembly constituencies in Kollam district
1967 establishments in Kerala
Constituencies established in 1967